The Nathpa Jhakri Dam is a concrete gravity dam on the Sutlej river in Himachal Pradesh, India. The primary purpose of the dam is hydroelectric power production and it supplies a  underground power station with water. Before reaching the power station, water is diverted through a  headrace tunnel. Construction on the project began in 1993 and it was complete in 2004. The last two of the  Francis turbine-generators went online in March 2004. It is owned by SJVN.

Scheduling and generation despatch
The scheduling and despatch of the Nathpa Jhakri Hydro Power plant is done by Northern Regional Load Despatch Centre which is the apex body to ensure the integrated operation of the power system grid in the Northern region and comes under Power System Operation Corporation Limited (POSOCO).

Sponsors and investors 
 Sponsor Nathpa Jhakri Power Corporation 
 Kvaerner / ABB / Siemens / Sulzer Escher Wyss 
 Foundation Continental Construction Corporation 
 BHEL
 Jaiprakash Associates Limited

See also 

 Karcham Wangtoo Hydroelectric Plant – situated upstream
List of dams and reservoirs in India

References 

Dams completed in 2004
Energy infrastructure completed in 2004
Hydroelectric power stations in Himachal Pradesh
Dams in Himachal Pradesh
Gravity dams
Underground power stations
2004 establishments in Himachal Pradesh
Dams on the Sutlej River
Buildings and structures in Kinnaur district